KBBI (890 AM) is a National Public Radio member radio station in Homer, Alaska. KBBI is a Class A, clear-channel station which broadcasts with a power of 10,000 watts.

References

External links
 FCC History Cards for KBBI
 KBBI official website

KBBI
BBI
BBI
Radio stations established in 1970
1970 establishments in Alaska